R Ursae Minoris is a star in the constellation Ursa Minor. A red giant of spectral type M7IIIe, it is a semiregular variable ranging from magnitude 8.5 to 11.5 over a period of 325 days.

References

Ursa Minor (constellation)
M-type giants
Semiregular variable stars
Ursae Minoris, R
Emission-line stars
Durchmusterung objects
149683
080802